Raffles Hospital (abbreviation: RH)(Chinese: 莱佛士医院 : Lái fú shì yīyuàn) is a tertiary care private hospital of the Raffles Medical Group, a private healthcare provider in Singapore.

History
On September 12, 1997, two companies, Raffles Medical Group and Pidemco Land formed a joint-venture company to convert Blanco Court, a former office-and-shopping block situated near the Bugis Mass Rapid Transit Station, into the present Raffles Hospital. 

Raffles Hospital was officially opened on March 16, 2002 by the former Deputy Prime Minister Lee Hsien Loong.

Hospital Building

The hospital is a L-shaped building covering  of floor space over 13 floors. It is a retrofitted building that has retained the main superstructure of its predecessor, Blanco Court. 

Patient accommodation at the hospital includes suites, private rooms, double rooms and cost saving four bedroom and six bedroom facility.

On December 13, 2008, Raffles Hospital was accredited by the Joint Commission International.

Awards
Raffles hospital was rated hospital of the year in 2016 by Frost & Sullivan Singapore Excellence Awards. With 380 in-patient beds, Raffles Hospital was rated by Newsweek as the number 10 hospital in Singapore in 2020.

References

External links

Hospital buildings completed in 2002
Hospitals in Singapore
Hospitals established in 2002
2002 establishments in Singapore